Powerman Duathlons are duathlon events that are competed over middle distance (10 km run, 60 km bike, 10 km run) to long distance (10 km run, 150 km bike, 30 km run)  duathlons across the globe at both Age Group and Elite level. All events are draft illegal allowing competitors to compete utilising time trial or triathlon bikes following the Powerman and ITU race regulations

Powerman World Series
The Powerman World Series is made up of 10-20 Powerman Duathlon races each year incorporating International Triathlon Union Continental and World Championships as well as world series races. The World Series title is contested from September to September each year with points awarded for the top positions at each event in the series, the final event of the season is the World Triathlon Long Distance Duathlon Championships Powerman Zofingen in Switzerland

Powerman World Rankings
The Powerman Duathlon World Rankings  are determined on a rolling format, utilising the points awarded over the previous 12 months competitions in the world series following the rules set out by the Powerman Ranking system  Since 2019 there are separate Age Group World rankings as well as those for the elite. The world rankings are updated after each competition in the series.
Current rankings: http://www.powerman.org/ranking-results

Powerman Series Race winners

Power(wo)man World Series Medallists

Powerman World Series Medallists

References

External links
 Official website
 
 
 

Duathlon